Myth Makers: Orbs of Doom is a video game for the Wii and PlayStation 2 by UK-based Data Design Interactive. Similar to Super Monkey Ball, it is a part of their Myth Makers franchise, which features cartoon style graphics that is aimed for a family-friendly market. Like many other of Data Design's games, it has met with negative reviews.

Gameplay
In the game, the player controls a Myth Maker (a member of a group of fantasy characters) who is trapped in one of the titular orbs. The player must tilt their way through many levels of mazes and obstacles that are cruising at 30,000 feet. If the player falls off a ledge, they will have to start all the way back at the beginning of the level. There are also no checkpoints. There is a multiplayer mode where the player can have up to three friends playing the game with them.

Reception
The game has received negative reviews. IGN gave the game 2.9/10, criticizing it for controls and gameplay. IGN summed up their review by saying "The credits for Orbs of Doom reveal that the Quality Assurance team was the largest group that worked on the game. My question is: what were they doing with their time instead of testing Orbs of Doom? Games are supposed to be fun, right? Even if you're the world's biggest Super Monkey Ball fan, stay away from this one. It's ugly, it doesn't control well, and the "gameplay" is infuriating. I'm all for casual games, but there is nothing casual about this."

References

2007 video games
Data Design Interactive games
Puzzle video games
Fantasy video games
Video games developed in the United Kingdom
Wii games
PlayStation 2 games
Multiplayer and single-player video games